Erika Roe (born 1957), also known as the Twickenham Streaker, is a woman remembered for a topless run across the pitch of Twickenham Stadium near London, England, during an England vs. Australia rugby union match on 2 January 1982. It has been described by the BBC as "perhaps the most famous of all streaks." Roe, who later attributed the inspiration to alcohol, ran onto the field during half time, exposing her 40-inch (102 cm) bosom. Roe and Sarah Bennett, the friend who joined her streak, were corralled by officials.

While Roe was not the first or the last streaker at an athletic event, in 2007 The Independent of London declared that her "memorable" streak made her a suitable icon to represent all such streakers in their article on sports interruptions. The event prompted web site Manchester Confidential to dub her "the most famous British streaker".

Roe's continuing notoriety saw her appear on the nostalgic British TV programmes After They Were Famous (1999) and 80s Mania (2001).

She worked at that time in a bookstore in Petersfield, Hampshire, but later moved with her husband and children to Portugal, where, as of 2001, she and her family operated a sweet potato farm.

In March 2016 she appeared as a contestant on series 3 of The Island with Bear Grylls. This followed her re-appearance in 2015, to raise awareness for Breast Cancer.

References

1957 births
Living people
Date of birth missing (living people)
People from Petersfield
Place of birth missing (living people)
Streakers